Kurudiol Lagoon is a salty lagoon in the Tuzly Lagoons group in Tatarbunary Raion of Odessa Oblast, Ukraine. It is located between the Alibey and Burnas Lagoons. The water body is included to the Tuzly Lagoons National Nature Park.

Sources
 Starushenko L.I., Bushuyev S.G. (2001) Prichernomorskiye limany Odeschiny i ih rybohoziaystvennoye znacheniye. Astroprint, Odessa, 151 pp. 

Tuzly Lagoons